The House I Live In is a live album featuring saxophonists Archie Shepp and Lars Gullin recorded at the Jazzhus Montmartre in Copenhagen, Denmark on November 21, 1963 and released on the Steeplechase label in 1980.

Reception
The Allmusic review by Scott Yanow calls the album "a fascinating [and] important historical release".

Track listing
 "You Stepped Out of a Dream" (Nacio Herb Brown, Gus Kahn) - 19:06  
 "I Should Care" (Sammy Cahn, Axel Stordahl, Paul Weston) - 9:00  
 "The House I Live In" (Earl Robinson) - 9:09  
 "Sweet Georgia Brown" (Ben Bernie, Kenneth Casey, Maceo Pinkard) - 11:22  
Recorded in Copenhagen, Denmark on November 21, 1963.

Personnel
Archie Shepp - tenor saxophone
Lars Gullin - baritone saxophone
Tete Montoliu - piano
Niels-Henning Ørsted Pedersen - bass
Alex Riel - drums

References

Lars Gullin albums
1963 live albums
Archie Shepp live albums
SteepleChase Records live albums